The chapters of the manga series Black Butler are written and illustrated by Yana Toboso and have been serialized in Square Enix's Monthly GFantasy since its premiere in October 2006. The series follows Sebastian Michaelis, a demonic butler who is obligated to serve Ciel Phantomhive, the thirteen-year-old head of the Phantomhive noble family, due to a contract he made with Ciel.

Since its premiere, over one hundred chapters have been released in Japan. On July 11, 2008, Gakken's Animedia magazine confirmed the manga was going to be adapted into an anime series, directed by Toshiya Shinohara and produced by A-1 Pictures, which began airing in October 2008 and ended its run in March 2009.

The individual chapters are published in tankōbon by Square Enix under their Gangan Comics imprint. The first volume was released on February 27, 2007 and, as of July 27, 2022, thirty-two volumes have been released. In July 2009, Yen Press licensed the series for an English language release and began to serialize the manga in its Yen Plus August 2009 issue for the magazine's first anniversary. They released the first volume in January 2010. Every chapter follows a naming scheme:  followed by a comma and a word or phrase composed of two kanji.



Volume list

Chapters not yet in tankōbon format 
These chapters have yet to be published in a tankōbon volume.
Ch.096.5 "That Butler, Friendly"
Ch.099.5 "That Butler, Nursing
Ch.101.5 "The Butler, Requested"
Ch.131.5 "That Butler, Resting
Ch.186 : 
Ch.187 : 
Ch.188 : 
Ch.189 : 
Ch.190 : 
Ch.191 : 
Ch.192 : 
Ch.193 : 
Ch.194 : 
Ch.195 : 
Ch.196 : 
Ch.197 : 
Ch.198 :

References

Black Butler
Black Butler